The following outline is provided as an overview of and topical guide to French Polynesia:

French Polynesia – French overseas collectivity located in the South Pacific Ocean.  It is made up of several groups of Polynesian islands, the most famous island being Tahiti in the Society Islands group, which is also the most populous island and the seat of the capital of the territory (Papeete). Although not an integral part of its territory, Clipperton Island was administered from French Polynesia until 2007.

General reference

 Pronunciation: 
 Common English country name: French Polynesia
 Official English country name: The French Overseas Collectivity of French Polynesia
 Common endonym(s):   Polynésie française (French), Pōrīnetia farāni (Tahitian), Fenua mā’ohi (Tahitian)
 Official endonym(s):  
 Adjectival(s): French Polynesian
 Demonym(s):
 Etymology: Name of French Polynesia
 ISO country codes: PF, PYF, 258
 ISO region codes: See ISO 3166-2:PF
 Internet country code top-level domain: .pf

Geography of French Polynesia 

Geography of French Polynesia
 French Polynesia is: a territory of France
 Location:
 Southern Hemisphere and Eastern Hemisphere
 Pacific Ocean
 South Pacific Ocean
 Oceania
 Polynesia
 Time zones:
 Gambier Islands – UTC-09
 Marquesas Islands - UTC-09:30
 Rest of French Polynesia – UTC-10
 Extreme points of French Polynesia
 High:  Mont Orohena 
 Low:  South Pacific Ocean 0 m
 Land boundaries:  none
 Coastline:  2,525 km
 Population of French Polynesia: 259,596 (August 20, 2007)  - —th most populous country

 Area of French Polynesia: 4,167 km2
 Atlas of French Polynesia

Environment of French Polynesia 

 Climate of French Polynesia
 Renewable energy in French Polynesia
 Geology of French Polynesia
 Protected areas of French Polynesia
 Biosphere reserves in French Polynesia
 National parks of French Polynesia
 Wildlife of French Polynesia
 Fauna of French Polynesia
 Birds of French Polynesia
 Mammals of French Polynesia

Natural geographic features of French Polynesia 

 Atolls of French Polynesia
 Fjords of French Polynesia
 Islands of French Polynesia
 Lakes of French Polynesia
 Mountains of French Polynesia
 Volcanoes in French Polynesia
 Rivers of French Polynesia
 Waterfalls of French Polynesia
 Valleys of French Polynesia
 World Heritage Sites in French Polynesia
 Taputapuatea marae

Regions of French Polynesia 

Regions of French Polynesia

Ecoregions of French Polynesia 

List of ecoregions in French Polynesia

Administrative divisions of French Polynesia 

Administrative divisions of French Polynesia
 Provinces of French Polynesia
 Districts of French Polynesia
 Municipalities of French Polynesia

Provinces of French Polynesia 

Provinces of French Polynesia

Districts of French Polynesia 

Districts of French Polynesia

Municipalities of French Polynesia 

Municipalities of French Polynesia
 Capital of French Polynesia: Papeete
 Cities of French Polynesia

Demography of French Polynesia 

Demographics of French Polynesia

Government and politics of French Polynesia 

Politics of French Polynesia
 Form of government: parliamentary representative democratic French overseas collectivity
 Capital of French Polynesia: Papeete
 Elections in French Polynesia
 Political parties in French Polynesia

Branches of the government of French Polynesia 

Government of French Polynesia

Executive branch of the government of French Polynesia 
 Head of state: President of French Polynesia,
 Head of government: Prime Minister of French Polynesia,
 Cabinet of French Polynesia

Legislative branch of the government of French Polynesia 

 Parliament of French Polynesia (bicameral)
 Upper house: Senate of French Polynesia
 Lower house: House of Commons of French Polynesia

Judicial branch of the government of French Polynesia 

Court system of French Polynesia
 Supreme Court of French Polynesia

Foreign relations of French Polynesia 

Foreign relations of French Polynesia
 Diplomatic missions in French Polynesia
 Diplomatic missions of French Polynesia

International organization membership 
The government of French Polynesia is a member of:
Conference des Ministres des Finances des Pays de la Zone Franc (FZ)
International Trade Union Confederation (ITUC)
Pacific Islands Forum (PIF) (associate member)
Secretariat of the Pacific Community (SPC)
Universal Postal Union (UPU)
World Meteorological Organization (WMO)

Law and order in French Polynesia 

Law of French Polynesia
 Constitution of French Polynesia
 Crime in French Polynesia
 Human rights in French Polynesia
 LGBT rights in French Polynesia
 Freedom of religion in French Polynesia
 Law enforcement in French Polynesia

Military of French Polynesia 

Military of French Polynesia
 Command
 Commander-in-chief:
 Ministry of Defence of French Polynesia
 Forces
 Army of French Polynesia
 Navy of French Polynesia
 Air Force of French Polynesia
 Special forces of French Polynesia
 Military history of French Polynesia
 Military ranks of French Polynesia

Local government in French Polynesia 

Local government in French Polynesia

History of French Polynesia 

History of French Polynesia
Timeline of the history of French Polynesia
Current events of French Polynesia
 Military history of French Polynesia

Culture of French Polynesia 

Culture of French Polynesia
 Architecture of French Polynesia
 Cuisine of French Polynesia
 Festivals in French Polynesia
 Languages of French Polynesia
 Media in French Polynesia
 Television in French Polynesia
 National symbols of French Polynesia
 Coat of arms of French Polynesia
 Flag of French Polynesia
 National anthem of French Polynesia
 People of French Polynesia
 Public holidays in French Polynesia
 Records of French Polynesia
 Religion in French Polynesia
 Christianity in French Polynesia
 Hinduism in French Polynesia
 Islam in French Polynesia
 Judaism in French Polynesia
 Sikhism in French Polynesia
 World Heritage Sites in French Polynesia: None

Art in French Polynesia 
 Art in French Polynesia
 Cinema of French Polynesia
 Literature of French Polynesia
 Music of French Polynesia
 Theatre in French Polynesia

Sports in French Polynesia 

Sports in French Polynesia
 Football in French Polynesia
Polynesia at the Olympics

Economy and infrastructure of French Polynesia 

Economy of French Polynesia
 Economic rank, by nominal GDP (2007): 142nd (one hundred and forty second)
 Agriculture in French Polynesia
 Banking in French Polynesia
 National Bank of French Polynesia
 Communications in French Polynesia
 Internet in French Polynesia
 Companies of French Polynesia
Currency of French Polynesia: Franc
ISO 4217: XPF
 Energy in French Polynesia
 Energy policy of French Polynesia
 Oil industry in French Polynesia
 Mining in French Polynesia
 Tourism in French Polynesia
 Visa policy of the French overseas departments and territories
 Transport in French Polynesia
 French Polynesia Stock Exchange

Education in French Polynesia 

Education in French Polynesia

Infrastructure of French Polynesia

 Health care in French Polynesia
 Transportation in French Polynesia
 Airports in French Polynesia
 Rail transport in French Polynesia
 Roads in French Polynesia

See also
 French Polynesia

Index of French Polynesia-related articles
List of international rankings
Outline of France
Outline of geography
Outline of Oceania

References

External links

 Tourism
 Official Tourism Website

 Government
 Government of French Polynesia
 Presidency of French Polynesia
 Administrative Subdivisions of French Polynesia

French Polynesia